Peggy Schierenbeck (born 9 October 1970) is a German politician of the Social Democratic Party (SPD) who has been a Member of the German Bundestag from Lower Saxony since 2021.

Early life 
Schierenbeck was born in Neuwied.

Political career 
Schierenbeck contested the constituency of Diepholz – Nienburg I in the 2021 German federal election. 

In parliament, Schierenbeck has since been serving on the Committee on Internal Affairs and Community and the Committee on Food and Agriculture. In addition to her committee assignments, she has been a member of the German delegation to the Franco-German Parliamentary Assembly since 2022.

References 

Living people
1970 births
Members of the Bundestag for Lower Saxony
Female members of the Bundestag
Members of the Bundestag 2021–2025
21st-century German women politicians
Members of the Bundestag for the Social Democratic Party of Germany
People from Neuwied